An ultrasound research interface (URI) is a software tool loaded onto a diagnostic clinical ultrasound device which provides functionality beyond typical clinical modes of operation. 

A normal clinical ultrasound user only has access to the ultrasound data in its final processed form, typically a B-Mode image, in DICOM format. For reasons of device usability they also have limited access to the processing parameters that can be modified.

A URI allows a researcher to achieve different results by either acquiring the image at various intervals through the processing chain, or changing the processing parameters.

Typical B-mode receive processing chain

A typical digital ultrasound processing chain for B-Mode imaging may look as follows:
Multiple analog signals are acquired from the ultrasound transducer (the transmitter/receiver applied to the patient)
Analog signals may pass through one or more analog notch filters and a variable-gain amplifier (VCA)
Multiple analog-to-digital converters convert the analog radio frequency (RF) signal to a digital RF signal sampled at a predetermined rate (typical ranges are from 20MHz to 160MHz) and at a predetermined number of bits (typical ranges are from 10 bits to 16 bits)
Beamforming is applied to individual RF signals by applying time delays and summations as a function of time and transformed into a single RF signal
The RF signal is run through one or more digital FIR or IIR filters to extract the most interesting parts of the signal given the clinical operation
The filtered RF signal runs through an envelope detector and is log compressed into a grayscale format

Multiple signals processed in this way are lined up together and interpolated and rasterized into a readable image.

Data access

A URI may provide data access at many different stages of the processing chain, these include:
Pre-beamformed digital RF data from individual channels
Beamformed RF data
Envelope detected data
Interpolated image data

Where many diagnostic ultrasound devices have Doppler imaging modes for measuring blood flow, the URI may also provide access to Doppler related signal data, which can include:
Demodulated (I/Q) data
FFT spectral data
Autocorrelated velocity color Doppler data

Tools

A URI may include many different tools for enabling the researcher to make better use of the device and the data captured, some of these tools include:
Custom MATLAB programs for reading and processing signal and image data
Software Development Kits (SDKs) for communicating with the URI, signal processing and other specialized modes of operation available on the URI

References

Ultrasound Research Laboratories
The following non-exhaustive list of research labs are typical candidates that would use an ultrasound research interface for conducting experiments and collecting data.
NTNU Ultrasound Research Group
Duke Biomedical Imaging
Stanford Ultrasound Lab
Mayo Clinic Ultrasound Imaging Lab
Western Biomedical Ultrasound Research Lab
Physics for Medicine lab, Paris

Ultrasound 
Medical ultrasonography
Medical physics